is a passenger railway station  located in the city of Gyōda, Saitama, Japan, operated by East Japan Railway Company (JR East).

Lines
Gyōda Station is served by the Takasaki Line, with through Shonan-Shinjuku Line and Ueno-Tokyo Line services to and from the Tokaido Line.

Station layout
The station has one island platform serving two tracks, with an elevated station building located above and at a right angle to the platforms. The station is staffed.

Platforms

History 
The station opened on 1 July 1966. The station became part of the JR East network after the privatization of the JNR on 1 April 1987.

Passenger statistics
In fiscal 2019, the station was used by an average of 6569 passengers daily (boarding passengers only).

Surrounding area
 Gyōda City Tourist Information Center

See also
List of railway stations in Japan

References

External links

603  JR East Station Information

Railway stations in Japan opened in 1966
Railway stations in Saitama Prefecture
Stations of East Japan Railway Company
Takasaki Line
Shōnan-Shinjuku Line
Gyōda